James Clarence Hamilton (March 6, 1913 – December 14, 1991) was a Negro league pitcher in the 1940s.

A native of Marion County, Florida, Hamilton made his Negro leagues debut in 1940 with the Homestead Grays. He went on to play three seasons with the Grays through 1942. Hamilton died in 1991 in Bradenton, Florida at age 78.

References

External links
 and Seamheads

1913 births
1991 deaths
Homestead Grays players
Baseball pitchers